Alison Mariella Désir is an author, activist, and runner. Her book, Running While Black (Penguin Books) was published on October 18, 2022. She is the founder of Harlem Run, creator of Run 4 All Women and serves as Oiselle’s director of sports advocacy and co-chairs the Running Industry Diversity Coalition.

Désir is of Haitian and Colombian descent and is a Columbia University alumna. She grew up in Teaneck, New Jersey and as of 2022 lives outside Seattle, Washington.

References

External links

People from Teaneck, New Jersey
Columbia University alumni
American non-fiction writers
Anti-racism activists
Year of birth missing (living people)
Living people